Muhammad Irshad (born 3 August 1995) is a Pakistani first-class cricketer who plays for Service Industries and Sui Gas Corporation of Pakistan as a right-arm medium-fast. He has also represented the PCB Patron's XI.

Early life 
Irshad was born in Malakand, Pakistan.

Career
In November 2010, Irshad was part of the team at the 2010 Asian Games in Guangzhou, China which won a bronze medal by beating Sri Lanka in the third place playoffs.

References

External links
 

1983 births
Asian Games bronze medalists for Pakistan
Asian Games medalists in cricket
Baluchistan cricketers
Cricketers at the 2010 Asian Games
Cricketers from Khanewal
Khan Research Laboratories cricketers
Lahore Eagles cricketers
Living people
Medalists at the 2010 Asian Games
Multan cricketers
Pakistani cricketers
Sui Northern Gas Pipelines Limited cricketers
United Bank Limited cricketers
21st-century Pakistani people